The local assembly of bishops is the Episcopal Conference of Benin (French: Catholic Bishops Conférence du Bénin, CEB).

The CEB is a member of the Regional Episcopal Conference of Francophone West Africa and Symposium of Episcopal Conferences of Africa and Madagascar (SECAM).

List of Presidents:

1970-1971: Bernardin Gantin, Archbishop of Cotonou

1972-1991: Christophe Adimou, Archbishop of Cotonou

1991-1999: Lucien Monsi-Agboka, Bishop of Abomey

2001-2006: Nestor Assogba, Archbishop of Cotonou

2006 - ... Antoine Ganye, Bishop of Dassa-Zoumé and Archbishop of Cotonou

See also
Catholic Church in Benin

References

External links
 https://web.archive.org/web/20090831041133/http://www.benin-catholique.org/
 http://www.gcatholic.org/dioceses/country/BJ.htm
 http://www.catholic-hierarchy.org/country/bj.html 

Benin
Catholic Church in Benin

it:Chiesa cattolica in Benin#Conferenza episcopale